Baajaa Gaajaa: Music from 21st Century is an annual three-day music event in Pune organized by Underscore Records Pvt. Ltd., established in 2009.

The Team
Co-director, Shubha Mudgal is a versatile Indian performer who has received training from some of India 's greatest musicians such as Ram Ashreya Jha, Vinay Chandra Maudgalya, Vasant Thakar, Jitendra Abhisheki, Kumar Gandharva and Naina Devi. Awarded the Padmashri by the Government of India in 2000, she is acclaimed both as a composer and a performer, and maintains a keen and active interest in multimedia and Internet projects related to music.

Co-director, Aneesh Pradhan is disciple of tabla maestro Nikhil Ghosh, Aneesh has gained recognition both as a soloist and an accompanist to vocal and instrumental music as well as dance. In addition to being an accomplished performer, Aneesh was awarded a doctoral degree in History from the University of Mumbai . A successful composer, Aneesh has also written on music and has been involved as a contributor to and editor for websites on Indian music.

References

External links
 http://BaajaaGaajaa.com/
 http://UnderscoreRecords.com
 https://web.archive.org/web/20110717154247/http://podcasts.underscorerecords.com/
 https://web.archive.org/web/20081219150304/http://blog.shubhamudgal.com/
 https://web.archive.org/web/20080905225631/http://blog.aneeshpradhan.com/
 http://BaajaaGaajaa.com/
 Baajaa Gaajaa 2009, Part 1
 Baajaa Gaajaa 2009, Part 2
 Baajaa Gaajaa 2010, Part 1
 Baajaa Gaajaa 2010, Part 2

Music festivals in India
Culture of Pune
Folk festivals in India
Music festivals established in 2009